Rikako Fukase (born August 12, 1997) is a Japanese ice dancer. With her skating partner, Oliver Zhang, she is the 2020 NHK Trophy silver medalist and a two-time Japanese national medalist. They competed in the final segment at the 2020 Four Continents Championships.

With her former skating partner, Aru Tateno, she has competed in the final segment at three ISU Championships. The duo placed 19th at the 2016 World Junior Championships in Debrecen, Hungary; 13th at the 2017 World Junior Championships in Taipei, Taiwan; and 11th at the 2018 Four Continents Championships in Taipei.

Programs

With Zhang

With Tateno

Competitive highlights 
CS: Challenger Series; JGP: Junior Grand Prix

Ice dancing with Zhang

Ice dancing with Tateno

Ladies' singles

References

External links 
 
 

1997 births
Japanese female ice dancers
Living people
People from Saitama Prefecture